The men's 5000 metres event was part of the track and field athletics programme at the 1924 Summer Olympics. The competition was held on July 8, 1924, and on July 10, 1924. 38 long-distance runners from 21 nations competed.

Records
These were the standing world and Olympic records (in minutes) prior to the 1924 Summer Olympics.

In the final Paavo Nurmi set a new Olympic record with 14:31.2 minutes.

Results

Semifinals

All semi-finals were held on Tuesday, July 8, 1924.

The best four finishers of every heat qualified for the final.

Semifinal 1

Semifinal 2

Semifinal 3

Final
The final was held on Thursday, July 10, 1924.

Nurmi had to improve the standing Olympic record to win the gold medal with Ritola only two tenths behind.

References

Notes
 Official Report
 

Men's 05000 metres
5000 metres at the Olympics